Salihu Ibrahim FSS, FHWC (25 June 1935 – 10 December 2018) was a Nigerian army general who was Chief of Army Staff from August 1990 until September 1993 during the military regime of General Ibrahim Babangida.

Biography 
Ibrahim joined the army in 1956. 
He was given officer's training at the Nigerian Military Training College.
He became a respected Armored Corps officer, considered apolitical although he served as a member of Major-General Muhammadu Buhari's Supreme Military Council (1984-1985).
He was briefly arrested in August 1985, during the coup in which Ibrahim Babangida took over from Buhari.
Later he became a member of Babangida's Armed Forces Ruling Council.
He was appointed Commandant of the Nigeria Defence Academy (1988 - 1990).

In August 1990, General Sani Abacha, then Chief of Army staff (COAS) ceded this job to Ibrahim, while remaining Chairman Joint Chiefs and becoming Minister of Defence. Ibrahim was unable to assert much authority, with Abacha even refusing to vacate FlagStaff House, the traditional residence of the COAS. In August 1993, then head of state Ibrahim Babangida appointed Lt. General Aliyu Mohammed as his replacement, but Abacha delayed the change until September to allow Ibrahim time to "retire with honor". After retirement he was appointed a Pro-Chancellor and Chairman of council of the University of Ilorin. He became a member of the board of several Companies. As of 2010 he was Chairman of the International Energy Insurance Company. He died in December 2018 in his home in Kogi State, at the age of 83.

References

1935 births
2018 deaths
Nigerian Muslims
Nigerian Defence Academy Commandants
Nigerian generals
Nigerian Military School alumni
Chiefs of Army Staff (Nigeria)